Hasanabad-e Tavakkoli (also Romanized as Ḩasanābād-e Tavakkolī; also known as Ḩasanābād and Ḩasanābād-e Tavakkol) is a village in Lay Siyah Rural District, in the Central District of Nain County, Isfahan Province, Iran. At the 2006 census, its population was 10, in 5 families.

References 

Populated places in Nain County